Wincenty Trojanowski (born 1859 in Warsaw, died 1928 therein) was a Polish painter.

Wincenty Trojanowski began his art studies in the year of 1878 to 1880, in Warsaw, where he was taught by Wojciech Gerson and Aleksander Kamiński, he continued his studies at the Imperial Academy of Arts in St. Peterburg; from 1885, he studied for one year at the Academy of Fine Arts in Munich, where he was taught by Alexander von Wagner. In 1890, he left for his art travels to the Near East, after which he came back in 1893, and lived in Paris, where he continued painting. In 1904, he moved back to Warsaw, where a year later he founded the Art School of Applied Arts (Szkoła Artystyczną Sztuki Stosowanej).

See also

Orientalism
List of Orientalist artists

References

External links

1859 births
1928 deaths
19th-century Polish painters
19th-century Polish male artists
20th-century Polish painters
20th-century Polish male artists
Orientalist painters
Polish male painters